Sergio Corbucci (6 December 1926 – 1 December 1990) was an Italian film director, screenwriter and producer. He directed both very violent Spaghetti Westerns and bloodless Bud Spencer and Terence Hill action comedies.

He is the older brother of screenwriter and film director Bruno Corbucci.

Biography

Early career

Corbucci was born in Rome.

He started his career by directing mostly low-budget sword and sandal movies. Among his first Spaghetti Westerns were the films Grand Canyon Massacre (1964), which he co-directed (under the pseudonym, Stanley Corbett) with Albert Band, as well as Minnesota Clay (1964), his first solo directed Spaghetti Western. Corbucci's first commercial success was with the cult Spaghetti Western Django, starring Franco Nero, the leading man in many of his movies. He would later collaborate with Franco Nero on two other Spaghetti Westerns, Il Mercenario or The Mercenary (a.k.a. A Professional Gun) (1968) - where Nero played Sergei Kowalski, a Polish mercenary and the film also starring Tony Musante, Jack Palance and Giovanna Ralli - as well as Compañeros (1970) a.k.a. Vamos a matar, Companeros, which also starred Tomas Milian and Jack Palance. The last film of the "Mexican Revolution" trilogy - The Mercenary and Compañeros being the first two in the installment - was What Am I Doing in the Middle of the Revolution? (1972).

After Django, Corbucci made many other Spaghetti Westerns, which made him the most successful Italian western director after Sergio Leone and one of Italy's most productive and prolific directors. His most famous of these pictures was The Great Silence (Il Grande Silenzio), a dark and gruesome western starring a mute action hero and a psychopathic bad guy. The film was banned in some countries for its excessive display of violence.

Corbucci also directed Navajo Joe (1966), starring Burt Reynolds as the title character, a Navajo Indian opposing a group of bandits that killed his tribe, as well as The Hellbenders (1967), and Johnny Oro (1966) a.k.a. Ringo and his Golden Pistol starring Mark Damon. Other Spaghetti Westerns he directed include Gli specialisti (Drop Them or I'll Shoot, 1969), La Banda J.S.: Cronaca criminale del Far West (Sonny and Jed, 1972), with Tomas Milian and The White the Yellow and the Black (1975), with Tomas Milian and Eli Wallach.

Spaghetti Westerns
Corbucci's westerns were dark and brutal, with the characters portrayed as sadistic antiheroes. His films featured very high body counts and scenes of mutilation. Django especially is considered to have set a new level for violence in westerns.

Later career and legacy

In the 1970s and 1980s Corbucci mostly directed comedies, often starring Adriano Celentano. Many of these comedies were huge successes at the Italian box-office and found wide distribution in European countries like Germany, France, Austria and Switzerland, but were barely released overseas.

His movies were rarely taken seriously by contemporary critics and he was considered an exploitation director, but Corbucci has managed to attain a cult reputation.

He died in Rome in 1990, five days before his 64th birthday, of a heart attack.

His nephew Leonardo Corbucci continues the legacy of film directors in the family in Los Angeles.

Filmography

Director and writer

Salvate mia figlia (1951)
Foreign Earth (1954)
Island Sinner (1954)
Acque amare (1954)
Baracca e burattini (1954)
Carovana di canzoni (1955)
Suonno d'ammore (1955)
Supreme Confession (1956)
Ángeles sin cielo (1957)
I ragazzi dei Parioli (1959)
Who Hesitates is Lost (1960)
An American in Toledo (1960) *Only writer.
Totò, Peppino e... la dolce vita (1961)
Goliath and the Vampires (1961)
Duel of the Titans (1961)
The Two Marshals (1961)
The Slave (The Son of Spartacus, 1962)
Lo smemorato di Collegno (1962)
The Shortest Day (1963)
Il monaco di Monza (1963)
Gli onorevoli (1963)
Grand Canyon Massacre (1964) (as Stanley Corbett)
Castle of Blood (1964) (uncredited)Minnesota Clay (1965)I figli del leopardo (1965)The Man Who Laughs (1966)Django (1966)Ringo and his Golden Pistol (Johnny Oro, 1966)Navajo Joe (1966)The Cruel Ones (The Hellbenders, 1967)Death on the Run (1967)The Mercenary (A Professional Gun, 1968)The Great Silence (1968)Zum zum zum (1969) Co-director Bruno CorbucciThe Specialists (Drop Them or I'll Shoot, 1969)Compañeros (1970)Er più: storia d'amore e di coltello (1971)La Banda J.S.: Cronaca criminale del Far West (Sonny and Jed, 1972)What Am I Doing in the Middle of the Revolution? (1972)The Beast (1974)Shoot First... Ask Questions Later (The White the Yellow and the Black, 1975)Di che segno sei? (1975)Mr. Robinson (1975)The Con Artists (1976)Three Tigers Against Three Tigers (1977)Ecco noi per esempio... (1977)The Payoff (1978)Odds and Evens (1978)Neapolitan Mystery (1979)Super Fuzz (1980)I Don't Understand You Anymore (1980)I'm Getting a Yacht (1980)Who Finds a Friend Finds a Treasure (1981)My Darling, My Dearest (1982)Count Tacchia (1982)Sing Sing (1983)Questo e quello (1983)A tu per tu (1984)I Am an ESP (1985)Rimini Rimini (1987)Roba da ricchi (1987)Days of Inspector Ambrosio (1988)Night Club (1989)Women in Arms (1991)

Actor
Suonno d'ammore (1955) - Bank customer (uncredited)
Who Hesitates Is Lost (1960) - Billiard Player (uncredited)
Totò, Peppino e... la dolce vita (1961) - Signore in coda al telefono (uncredited)
Lo smemorato di Collegno (1962) - Man waiting for Minister (uncredited)
Gli onorevoli (1963) - Albergatore di Roccasecca (uncredited) (final film role)

References

External links

1926 births
1990 deaths
Film directors from Rome
Giallo film directors
Comedy film directors
Parody film directors
Spaghetti Western directors
Italian parodists